Namtok Phlio National Park is a national park in Chanthaburi Province, Thailand. The park is home to forested mountains, waterfalls, and many stupas and chedis from the reign of King Rama V. The mountains here are also known as Khao Sa Bap, a mountainous fragment of the western ends of the much larger Cardamom Mountains. The Sa Bap mountains are heavily eroded karst, rising to no more than 673 metres.

Geography
The park's area is 84,062 rai ~ .

History
During the reign of  King Rama V, the Along Khon chedi was built in 1876. In 1881 a memorial stupa, housing a relic of Princess Sunanta Kumari, was commissioned by King Rama V.

On 2 May 1975, the area was declared a national park as Khao Sa Bap National Park. On 29 September 1982, the park was renamed Namtok Phlio National Park.

Attractions
The park's main attraction is its namesake waterfall, Phlio, whose pools are home to large numbers of soro brook carp. The King Rama V era chedi and stupa are located near Phlio waterfall. Other park waterfalls include Khlong Narai, Makok and Trok Nong.

Flora and fauna
Namtok Phlio is covered in tropical rain forest, including such species as Aquilaria crassna, Shorea henryana, Hopea ferrea, Dipterocarpus turbinatus, Pterocymbium tinctorium, Garcinia celebica and Garcinia cowa.

Animal species include Sunda pangolin, lar gibbon, pig-tailed macaque, northern red muntjac, common palm civet, serow, chevrotain and wild boar.

The park is host to abundant bird species including heron, brahminy kite, shika, crested serpent eagle, besra, imperial pigeon, red turtle dove, emerald dove, hornbill, barbet, vernal hanging parrot, shrike, woodpecker, drongo, hill myna, bulbul and white-rumped shama.

See also
List of national parks of Thailand
List of Protected Areas Regional Offices of Thailand

References

National parks of Thailand
Geography of Chanthaburi province
Tourist attractions in Chanthaburi province
1975 establishments in Thailand
Protected areas established in 1975
Cardamom Mountains